Harry Allen or Harry Livingston (1882 – December 27, 1922) was an American transgender man from the Pacific Northwest who was the subject of ongoing sensationalist local and national newspaper coverage from 1900 until his death in 1922. The newspapers covered his petty crimes associated with life on the margins of society such as burglary, disorderly conduct, disturbing the peace, and vagrancy. He was also arrested after being involved in bar fights, and for drunkenness.

Family and early life
Allen was born in Indiana to Robert P. Pickerell and Jennie Gordon. The Pickerell family moved to the North End area of Seattle around 1894. Jennie Pickerell shared that Allen was allowed to wear boys' clothing and indulge his interest in masculine activities from a young age. Even with all his run-ins with the law, his mother was often quoted defending him in the paper and testifying in support of him before a judge.

Employment

Allen worked many kinds of jobs, such as waiter, hotel clerk, bartender, bouncer, shiphand, and cowhand. He was an aspiring prize fighter and a skilled boxer. Whenever the police made attempts to arrest Allen, he would fight back and officers had to wrestle him into handcuffs. Sometimes he used street-fighting tactics such as biting officers' hands and throwing rocks.

Personal life

Aliases 
He received disproportionate attention in reaction to his unapologetic rejection of a female gender assignment and refusal to conform to social demands that he dress and behave according to female norms. These titillating and exploitative stories — "great police blotter copy" — consistently referred to him with she/her pronouns and used his dead name, which is recorded in many of the news stories about him at the time alongside his chosen name, even while also reporting that Allen did take offense at this, and was outspoken in his insistence that he not be, in modern terms, misgendered. His name had been Harry Livingston from around 1900 until 1911, and then Harry Allen after, but is known on at least one occasion to have used the name George Allen. It is reported that Harry's mother used his chosen name to refer to him, and asked after him by that name when calling the police station to inquire when they would release him.

Suicides of his love interests 
Allen was a known to be a notorious ladies' man who pursued multiple women at a time, including married women. Of the many women he sought, or who sought him, four are reported to have died by suicide. The first was Dolly Quappe, who had been dating Allen for three weeks at the time of her death on December 25, 1901. The Seattle Star reported that Quappe had not known that Allen was transgender until he was arrested on suspicion of theft an overcoat at a dance in Ballard. After Quappe's suicide newspapers reported that Allen's jailers said he joked with them about having fooled Quappe about his sex. When he was released, on Christmas Day Quappe confronted him about his dating another young woman, Mabel Lacke. The two fought and Quappe snatched away Allen's watch-chain which contained a locket with a photograph of Lacke. Quappe was so angry as to threaten Allen's life and to threaten to kill herself. Later that day, she was found to have ingested carbolic acid she purchased from a pharmacy and passed away that evening. The Seattle Star reported the cause of her distress as the jealousy that she felt upon learning of Allen's duplicitousness, but other newspapers in the region implied or stated that it was also due to Allen's assigned sex at birth. According to The Victoria Daily Times, part of Quappe's infatuation with Allen was that he bore a resemblance to a man to whom she had previously been engaged, who had left her to marry another woman. After her death, Allen insisted that Quappe was aware of his transition, but police did not take him at his word because in all their letters she called him Harry Livingston.

The second woman to reportedly die by suicide due to a heart broken by Allen was Hazel Walters. A report by a Walla Walla paper The Evening Statesman erroneously attributed the story of Quappe's death to Walters' name, but provides the occasion of her death as March 1902. According to a profile published by The Seattle Star in 1915, Walters' manner of death was to throw herself from a 'cliff' at Madrona Park (Seattle) because she discovered he "was a woman". Walters left behind a note saying "I love you, Harry, though you are a living lie."

The third of Allen's lovers to die by suicide was Pearl Waldron, who shot herself in the chest with a 32-caliber revolver in Denny Park (Seattle) on November 4, 1903. Waldron and Allen had met at a dance in Georgetown. Waldron was found lying bloody in the park by a passerby who called the police and ambulance. She was taken to a hospital, and doctors worked to remove the bullet for over two hours before giving up on finding it all due to it being near vital organs. For more than an hour after she was found, Waldron refused to give her name or address. When she finally gave in she also asked that they send for Harry Livingston. Though Waldron left, she never stated her actions were related to Allen. The press and public laid the familiar suspicion that she was driven to shock and despair by discovering that he was transgender. Allen's mother told police and the press that she was sure Waldron knew, but Waldron's friends insisted that she did not and that she only knew him as Harry Livingston. Coincidentally, Waldron had a sister who had also shot herself over an unrequited love.

The fourth of Allen's paramours to die by suicide was Gertie Samuels, in January 1909. According to reports, Samuels shot herself in the chest after Allen left her at the altar because they couldn't be married as a homosexual couple.

Due to inconsistent reporting and allegations made by Allen that at least one of the suicide stories was fabricated by a reporter in Seattle for a quick payout, it is possible that the both or one of the stories about the suicides of Hazel Walters and Gertie Samuels are false. Articles that mention either Samuels or Walters by name tend to only mention the other and/or have mistakes attributing Quappe's cause of death to Walters' name. Additionally, while the stories of Quappe and Waldron include details such as their address of residence, place of birth, family, and an account of their treatment by doctors, the stories about Samuels and Walters lack those details and provide no mention of funeral arrangements.

Incarceration

On September 26, 1911, Allen was arrested for selling liquor to an indigenous person in Spokane, Washington. This was the first charge on which police held Allen for a prolonged period while he awaited a criminal trial. While incarcerated, the chief of the Spokane police tried to force Allen to switch to wearing skirts and feminine undergarments. The press and public were interested enough in what type of clothing he wore that they ran at least five articles during his two month stay at the county jail on whether Allen had donned a skirt yet. The police chief gave Allen the ultimatum between solitary confinement or finally wearing a dress when the jail reopened its women's ward, but Allen remained in the clothes of his choosing for the entirety of his stay at the county jail.

Death

Allen died of syphilitic meningitis in 1922, at the age of 40.

Newspaper articles

References

Further reading

 Allen appears as "Case I" under the initials H.A.

1882 births
1922 deaths
19th-century American LGBT people
20th-century American LGBT people
American transgender people 
Transgender men
LGBT people from Indiana
LGBT people from Washington (state)
Deaths from syphilis
Deaths from meningitis
Neurological disease deaths in Washington (state)
Infectious disease deaths in Washington (state)
American prisoners and detainees
Prisoners and detainees of Washington (state)